Petru Postoroncă (born 9 December 1991, in Chișinău, Moldova) is a Moldavian football midfielder who plays for German club FV Langenwinkel.

Career
On 12 May 2020, German Landesliga club FV Langenwinkel confirmed that Postoroncă had joined the club.

Club statistics
Total matches played in Moldavian First League: 2 matches - 0 goals

References

External links

Petru Postoroncă at FuPa

1991 births
Footballers from Chișinău
Moldovan footballers
Moldovan expatriate footballers
Living people
FC Dacia Chișinău players
FC Sfîntul Gheorghe players
FC Dinamo-Auto Tiraspol players
FC Spicul Chișcăreni players
FC Ungheni players
FC Victoria Bardar players
Moldovan Super Liga players
Association football midfielders
Moldovan expatriate sportspeople in Germany
Expatriate footballers in Germany